Rottweiler Records is a Christian metal record label based out of Dallas, Texas, United States. The label features bands such as Lust Control, Soul Embraced, The Jericho Harlot, 
and Pantokrator. The label started early on as a label that served punk rock, but has become a label that serves metal and punk. It is a Christian label, and therefore many of its artists are as well. The label was created by Shawn Browning, also known as Wretched of Grave Robber. Many bands on the label have placed high on CMW's charts and have had many positive reviews. The label participates in several compilations, including Kill the Ill a benefit comp for Rottweiler's owner Shawn Browning, and Metal Pulse: A Tribute to Dale Huffman.

The label partnered with a sister label, known as Nosral Recordings, with Frost Like Ashes guitarist Mike Larson heading it up. Nosral Recordings served as an extreme metal label primarily. 

On March 17, 2022, it was announced that Rottweiler Records and the subsidiary Hagah Recordings would be acquired by Mythic Panda Productions, an organization that works with Broken Flesh, A Hill to Die Upon, and Hrada, which features Peter Espevoll of Extol.

Current artists 

 Blood Thirsty
 Broken Flesh
 Brotality
 Decayed Existence
 Death Requisite
 Desolate Tomb
 Diatheke
 Final Surrender
 Forfeit Thee Untrue
 Forsaken Eternity
 Frost Like Ashes 
 GODIA 
 I Am the Pendragon
 Krig
 Light Unseen
 My Place Was Taken
 Ninth Sphere
 R.A.I.D.
 Shadowmourne
 Shamash
 Symphony of Heaven
 Taking the Head of Goliath
 UnTeachers
 (Un)Worthy
 Voluntary Mortification
 XIII Minutes

Former artists 

 Abated Mass of Flesh (active, independent)
 Absent from the Body (active)
 Aggelos (disbanded)
 The Autumn League (inactive)
 Awake the Suffering (inactive)
 Becoming Saints (disbanded)
 Behold the Kingdom (disbanded)
 Da Mac (disbanded)
 Dead Words (active)
 John DeGroff (active)
 Dispraised (active)
 Doomsday Hymn (active)
 Every Knee Shall Bow (active)
 Fight Before Surrender (disbanded)
 Flawed by Design (active)
 Grave Robber (active)
 Hand of Fire (active)
 Hilastherion (active)
 Immortal Souls (active)
 The Jericho Harlot (active)
 Lust Control (inactive)
 Never Buried (active)
 O Wretched Man (inactive)
 The Order of Elijah (active, signed to Luxor Records)
 Pantokrator (active, signed to Nordic Mission)
 Perpetual Paranoia (active, signed to Retroactive Records)
 Skald in Veum (active)
 Soul Embraced (inactive)
 Superunknown (active)
 Unchained (disbanded)
 Waxpanel (disbanded)
 Wretched Graverobber (active)
 Wretched Leper (active)

Affiliated artists
Among the Wolves (active)
Tim Bushong (active)
Chris Dickens (active)
InDeath:Alive (active)
Leper (active)
Our Corpse Destroyed (disbanded)
Josh Perkins (active)
Peter118 (active)
Rackets & Drapes (disbanded)
Relesser (active)

Discography

References

External links

American record labels
Christian record labels
Hardcore record labels
Heavy metal record labels
Punk record labels